The term supplementary can refer to:
 Supplementary angles
 Supplementary Benefit, a former benefit payable in the United Kingdom
 Supplementary question, a type of question asked during a questioning time for prime minister

See also
 Supplement (disambiguation)